Bradley is an unincorporated community in Jones County, Georgia, United States.

History
Bradley had its start in 1886 when the Central of Georgia Railroad was extended to that point. An early variant name was "Franks". A post office called Franks was established in 1887, the name was changed to Bradley in 1889, and the post office closed in 1959. The present name is after John Wiley Bradley Jr., a railroad agent.

References

Unincorporated communities in Jones County, Georgia
Unincorporated communities in Georgia (U.S. state)
1886 establishments in Georgia (U.S. state)
Populated places established in 1886